Sir Archibald Thomas Strong (30 December 1876 – 2 September 1930) was an Australian scholar and poet.

Early life

Strong was born at South Yarra, Melbourne, the son of Herbert Strong, professor of classics at the University of Melbourne, and his wife Helen Campbell, née Edmiston.

Strong and his family moved to Liverpool, England, in 1883 when Prof. Herbert Strong became professor of Latin at University College, Liverpool.
Archibald was educated at Sedbergh School and University College, Liverpool, where he graduated B.A. in 1896 with first-class honours in classics. Strong then went to Magdalen College, Oxford; however, a long illness prevented any possibility of a first in "Greats". Strong graduated in Literae Humaniores (1900) and spent several months at the University of Marburg, Germany, before returning to read law with F. E. Smith, 1st Earl of Birkenhead, then a rising barrister, afterwards to become Lord Chancellor of England. Strong became a member of the Middle Temple, but ill-health caused him in 1901 to return to Australia seeking a warmer climate.

Literary career
Settling again in Melbourne, Strong did some tutoring and lecturing, and published a volume of verse, Sonnets and Songs (1905). In 1910 Strong was president of the Literature Society of Melbourne and his presidential address, 'Nature in Meredith and Wordsworth', was printed as a pamphlet in that year. Strong was a long-term literary critic for the Herald newspaper and in 1911 republished some of his earlier writings for this journal under the title of Peradventure, A Book of Essays in Literary Criticism. Strong was appointed lecturer in English at the University of Melbourne in 1912, and brought out a volume of translations, The Ballads of Theodore de Banville (1913), followed by Sonnets of the Empire (1915). Strong was president of the Melbourne Shakespeare Society in 1913. When Professor Robert Wallace enlisted in the First AIF in 1916, Strong became acting-professor of English for three years. He was passionately patriotic and, having been rejected for active service, did much war work in addition to carrying on the English school. Some of his work was in the nature of propaganda; a collection of his articles, Australia and the War (1916) and The Story of the Anzacs, published anonymously at his own expense in aid of patriotic funds, appeared in 1917. From 1919 to 1922 he acted as Chief Film Censor for the Commonwealth government. A small volume of verse, Poems, appeared in 1918. In 1920 he became associate professor in English language and literature, and in the following year the Clarendon Press published his A Short History of English Literature, and Three Studies in Shelley and an Essay on Nature in Wordsworth and Meredith. In 1922 Strong was appointed the first Jury professor of English language and literature at the University of Adelaide, allowing Professor Henderson to concentrate on History.

Strong was ready for his new task, as in addition to his knowledge of the work of his own school he was an excellent classical scholar, familiar with French and German literature, and with some knowledge of Italian and Spanish in the originals. At Adelaide he became a valuable member of the staff, fully convinced of the importance of the humanities in university life. He visited Europe in 1925 and represented South Australia at a world conference on adult education held at Vancouver in 1929. Strong published his translation of Beowulf into English rhyming verse in 1925.

Late life and legacy
Strong died after a short illness on 2 September 1930. In 1932 Four Studies by him, edited with a memoir by Robert Cecil Bald and with a portrait frontispiece, was published in a limited edition at Adelaide. Strong never married; he was knighted in 1925.

Strong played both cricket and football at Liverpool University; he was also interested in boxing. Strong was one of the promoters of the original Melbourne repertory theatre and became president of the similar organization at Adelaide. Strong was a good lecturer in English, never losing his enthusiasm for his subject and communicating it to his students. Strong's Short History of English Literature is an excellent piece of work within the limits of its 200,000 words, sound and interesting. His verse is technically excellent, often no more than strongly felt rhetorical verse, but at times rising into poetry. Strong's translations from Théodore de Banville and Beowulf were both successful.

References

External links

Four studies / by Sir Archibald Strong ; edited with a memoir by R.C. Bald at the National Library of Australia

1876 births
1930 deaths
Academic staff of the University of Melbourne
Australian poets
Translators from Old English
Alumni of Magdalen College, Oxford
Knights Bachelor
Australian literary critics
Academic staff of the University of Adelaide
Australian people of English descent
People from South Yarra, Victoria